The Blace bunker raid was a Macedonian police operation to seize guarded weapons caches and bunkers held by members of the NLA in late April 2010 near the Kosovo border. The raid was conducted by members of the Macedonian Special Police Unit "Tigar".

Background

Armed conflict between ethnic Albanian insurgents and Macedonian security forces had previously occurred during the larger 2001 insurgency in Macedonia and during Operation Mountain Storm in the Tetovo region in 2007.

Raid

The raid occurred on 29 April 2010 and lasted the following day with Macedonian security forces engaging in brief skirmishes with members of the NLA who were guarding bunkers and weapons cashes on the Macedonian-Kosovo border. The Macedonian police forces successfully engaged the rebels who fled to Kosovo after a short fire exchange. The Macedonian police forces continued to "comb" the region and discovered a large quantity of weapons including 20 missiles, three mortars, three field guns, TNT explosives, hand grenades and anti-tank mines, also uncovered were emblems of uniforms of the former NLA. The Macedonian government claimed that the group was planning large military operations to destabilize Macedonia and the wider Balkan region. A group claiming to be the NLA claimed responsibility for the attack, although former leader of the NLA and member of the Macedonian government Ali Ahmeti denied that the NLA was responsible for the weapons caches and the firefight with the police, he condemned the use of violence by the group. NATO expressed concern and the large quantity of weapons found in the cashes, Admiral Mark Fitzgerald, Commander of NATO’s Allied Joint Force Command in Naples on his visit to Kosovo considered the incident worrying and one that could potentially destabilise a country like Macedonia.

Aftermath

Two weeks after the bunker raid the Macedonian police engaged in a shootout with veterans of the NLA who were smuggling weapons near the Kosovo border, Macedonian media suspected the two incidents were related but the Macedonian government refused to speculate on the issue. According to Macedonian Alpha TV the perpetrators of the 2015 Kumanovo clashes and the attack on the border post in Gošince were men who were previously involved with the incidents with the weapons cashes.

See also

 Raduša shootout
 2015 Kumanovo clashes
 2001 insurgency in Macedonia

References

2010 in the Republic of Macedonia